Pat Hyland may refer to:

 Pat Hyland (jockey), Australian jockey and horse trainer
 Lawrence A. Hyland (1897–1989), known as Pat, American electrical engineer